Neuwiedia zollingeri is a species of orchid that native to Hainan , Hong Kong, Yunnan, Borneo, Sumatra, Java, Bali, Malaysia, Singapore, Thailand, Vietnam.

Varieties
Four varieties are recognised as of June 2014:

 Neuwiedia zollingeri var. annamensis (Gagnep.) Aver - Vietnam
 Neuwiedia zollingeri var. javanica (J.J.Sm.) de Vogel - Vietnam, Borneo, Sumatra, Java, Bali
 Neuwiedia zollingeri var. singapureana (Wall. ex Baker) de Vogel - Hainan, Hong Kong, Yunnan, Thailand, Vietnam, Borneo, Sumatra, Malaysia
 Neuwiedia zollingeri var. zollingeri - Sumatra, Java

References

External links

zollingeri
Orchids of Asia
Orchids of Malaya
Terrestrial orchids
Flora of Malesia
Flora of Indo-China
Flora of Hainan
Flora of Hong Kong
Orchids of Bali
Orchids of Borneo
Orchids of China
Orchids of Java
Orchids of Sumatra
Orchids of Vietnam
Orchids of Yunnan
Plants described in 1857